Kamal Hossain (born 1937) is a Bangladeshi lawyer and politician. 

Kamal Hossain may also refer to:

 Kamal Hussain (wrestler) (born 1932), an Egyptian wrestler
 Kamal Hossain (kabaddi) (born 1978), Bangladeshi kabaddi player